Matija Gereb (or Mátyás Geréb) was the ban  of Croatia from 1483 to 1489. He was the son of John Geréb de Vingárt, vice-voivode of Transylvania and Zsófia Szilágyi from the House of Szilágyi.

Gereb is known to have participated in the retaking of Jajce from the Ottoman Empire along with Matthias Corvinus in 1463. Later, as ban, he defeated the Ottomans in the Battle of Una in 1483.

Gereb is known to have built a castle in the town of Jastrebarsko, now known as Erdödy Castle after the household Erdödy that later owned it. He died in 1489.

References 
 

1498 deaths
Bans of Croatia
Matthias
Year of birth unknown